Saint-Laurent-en-Caux is a commune in the Seine-Maritime department in the Normandy region in northern France.

Geography

Population

Places of interest
 The church of St.Laurent, dating from the nineteenth century.
 The remains of a feudal castle.
 A sixteenth century sandstone cross in the cemetery.
 Two 16th century manorhouses.

See also
Communes of the Seine-Maritime department

References

Communes of Seine-Maritime